There are several football rivalries amongst clubs in Chile.

Super Clásico 

Colo Colo vs Universidad de Chile

The rivalry between Colo Colo and Universidad de Chile is the biggest in Chile. It was first played in 1938.

Clásico Universitario 

Universidad de Chile vs Universidad Católica

This match, which represents the oldest derby in Chile, between the football teams of Universidad de Chile and Universidad Católica, that represent two of the most important universities and football teams in the country. Originally University clubs, they turned professional in the 1930s and kept their amateur names.

Colo Colo–Universidad Católica 

Colo Colo vs. Universidad Católica

Colo Colo–Cobreloa 

Colo Colo vs. Cobreloa

Clásico Aconcagüino 
Unión San Felipe vs. Trasandino de Los Andes

Clásico del Norte 
San Marcos de Arica vs. Deportes Iquique

Clásico Penquista 
Deportes Concepción vs. Fernández Vial

Clásico Provincial
San Luis de Quillota vs. Unión La Calera

Clásico de Colonias 
Unión Española vs. Palestino vs. Audax Italiano

There are three traditional rivals: Unión Española, founded by Spanish immigrants; Palestino, a team founded by members of the Palestinian diaspora living in Chile; and Audax Italiano, which originated from their local Italian counterpart, hence the name of the derbies. Unión Española is also the second oldest club of the Primera División Chilena with 113 years (behind Santiago Wanderers with 118 years) and all three clubs have a long history of rivalry. All three teams are based in Santiago.

Clásico Porteño 
Santiago Wanderers vs. Everton

It is played between Santiago Wanderers of Valparaiso, and Everton of Viña del Mar. It is the oldest derby in Chile. The first official match was played in 1944 with a 2-0 win for Everton.

One of the most notable games was on 29 September 2013, when 5 players were sent off (2 from Wanderers and 3 from Everton), Wanderers eventually winning 3-0, after a losing streak of 4 matches against his rival in the same year.

Clásico del Cobre 

Two teams associated with the copper rich regions and the industry Cobreloa and Cobresal contest the derby since the late 70's, when the clubs were founded.

Clásico del Maule 
Rangers de Talca vs. Curicó Unido

Clásico Chorero 
Huachipato vs. Naval de Talcahuano

Clásico del Sur 
Puerto Montt vs. Provincial Osorno

Clásico del Desierto 
Deportes Antofagasta vs Cobreloa

Clásico de la Cuarta Región 
La Serena vs. Coquimbo Unido

Huaso derby 
Rangers de Talca vs O'Higgins

References